Barakan is a surname. Notable people with the surname include:

 Michael Barakan aka. Shane Fontayne, English rock guitarist and audio engineer
 Peter Barakan, English DJ, broadcaster, and author; best known as the presenter for Begin Japanology

See also
 Baraghan, a village in Iran